Warren Hilton Shanabrook (November 30, 1880 – March 10, 1964) was a Major League Baseball third baseman. In one career game, he had no hits in two at-bats. He batted and threw right-handed.

Shanabrook was born in Massillon, Ohio and died in North Canton, Ohio.

External links 

1880 births
1964 deaths
Washington Senators (1901–1960) players
Major League Baseball third basemen
Baseball players from Ohio